Mordellistena maculaticeps is a species of beetles is the family Mordellidae.

References

maculaticeps
Beetles described in 1854